Sylvie D'Amours (born August 19, 1960) is a Canadian politician in Quebec, who was elected to the National Assembly of Quebec in the 2014 election. She represents the electoral district of Mirabel as a member of the Coalition Avenir Québec.

Early life 
D'Amours was born in the city of Malartic in the La Vallée-de-l'Or.

Political career 
Prior to her election to the legislature, D'Amours was a municipal councillor in Saint-Joseph-du-Lac.

She ran in Mirabel at the 2012 Quebec general election.

She was elected to the National Assembly of Quebec in the 2014 election.

D'Amours was re-elected at the 2018 general election.

Cabinet posts

References

Living people
1960 births
Coalition Avenir Québec MNAs
French Quebecers
Members of the Executive Council of Quebec
Women MNAs in Quebec
Quebec municipal councillors
Women government ministers of Canada
Women municipal councillors in Canada
21st-century Canadian politicians
21st-century Canadian women politicians